The Hebrew Bible makes reference to a number of covenants with God (YHWH). These include the Noahic Covenant (in Genesis), which is between God and all living creatures, as well as a number of more specific covenants with Abraham, the whole Israelite people, the Israelite priesthood, and the Davidic lineage of kings. In form and terminology, these covenants echo the kinds of treaty agreements in the surrounding ancient world.

The Book of Jeremiah, verses  says that  Yahweh will establish a new covenant with the house of Israel and the house of Judah. Most Christians believe this New Covenant is the "replacement" or "final fulfilment" of the Old Covenant described in the Old Testament and as applying to the People of God, while some believe both covenants are still applicable in a dual covenant theology.

Ancient Near Eastern treaties
The Hebrew term בְּרִית  bĕriyth for "covenant" is from a root with the sense of "cutting", because pacts or covenants were made by passing between cut pieces of flesh of an animal sacrifice.

There are two major types of covenants in the Hebrew Bible, including the obligatory type and the promissory type. The obligatory covenant is more common with the Hittite peoples, and deals with the relationship between two parties of equal standing. In contrast, the promissory type of covenant is seen in the Abrahamic and Davidic covenants. Promissory covenants focus on the relationship between the suzerain and the vassal and are similar to the "royal grant" type of legal document, which include historical introduction, border delineations, stipulations, witnesses, blessings, and curses. In royal grants, the master could reward a servant for being loyal. God rewarded Abraham, Noah, and David in his covenants with them. As part of his covenant with Abraham, God has the obligation to keep Abraham's descendants as God's chosen people and be their God. God acts as the suzerain power and is the party of the covenant accompanied by the required action that comes with the oath whether it be fire or animals in the sacrificial oaths.  In doing this, God is the party taking upon the curse if he does not uphold his obligation.  Through history there were also many instances where the vassal was the one who performed the different acts and took the curse upon them.

Terminology of covenants
Weinfeld believes that similar terminology and wording can connect the Abrahamic and Davidic covenants with ancient Near Eastern grants, as opposed to being largely similar to the Mosaic covenant, which, according to Weinfeld, is an example of a suzerainty treaty. He goes on to argue that phrases about having a "whole heart" or having "walked after me [God] with all his heart" strongly parallels with Neo-Assyrian grant language, such as "walked with royalty". He further argues that in Jeremiah, God uses prophetic metaphor to say that David will be adopted as a son. Expressing legal and political relationships through familial phraseology was common among Near Eastern cultures. Babylonian contracts often expressed fathership and sonship in their grants to actually mean a king to vassal relationship.

Further underlying the idea that these covenants were grant-like in nature is the similar language used in both. In the grant of Ashurbanipal, an Assyrian, to his servant Bulta, he describes Bulta's loyalty with the phrase "kept the charge of my kinship". Abraham similarly kept God's charge in Genesis 26: 4–5: "I will give to your descendants all these lands...in as much as Abraham obeyed me and kept my charge, my commandments, my rules and my teachings."

Dissolving covenant form
According to Mendenhall, pressures from outside invaders led the loosely bound Israelite tribes to converge into monarchical unity for stability and solidarity. He also argues that during this consolidation, the new state also had to unify the religious traditions that belonged to the different groups to prevent dissent from those who might believe that the formation of a state would replace direct governance from God. Therefore, Mendenhall continues, these loosely bound tribes merged under the Mosaic covenant to legitimize their unity. They believed that to obey the law was to obey God. They also believed that the king was put into power as a result of God's benefaction, and that this accession was the fulfillment of God's promise of dynasty to David. Mendenhall also notes that a conflict arose between those who believed in the Davidic covenant, and those who believed that God would not support all actions of the state. As a result, both sides became relatively aloof, and the Davidic covenant and the Mosaic covenant were almost entirely forgotten.

Biblical covenants

Number of biblical covenants
Students of the Bible hold wildly differing opinions as to how many major covenants exist (or did exist) between God and humanity, with numbers ranging from one to at least twelve. (See covenant theology and dispensationalism for further information on two of the major viewpoints.) Some scholars classify only two: a covenant of promise and a covenant of law. The former involved an oath taken by God - a word of promise instead of command - while the latter is known in the Bible as "the Law".

Noahic covenant

The Noahic covenant applies to all of humanity and all other living creatures. In this covenant with all living creatures, God promises never again to destroy all life on Earth by flood and creates the rainbow as the sign of this "everlasting covenant between God and every living creature of all flesh that is on the earth".

Noah and the generations of his posterity were required in their turn to procreate, not shed human blood (murder), because mankind was made in the image of God. Jews are forbidden to consume meat with the blood in it, but Bnei Noah Noahidism are allowed the blood of a living animal (Maimonides, Laws of Kings and  Wars, Chapter IX Law 10).

Abrahamic covenant

The covenant was for Abraham and his seed, or offspring, both of natural birth and adoption.

With Abraham multiple promised lands were given to his innumerable descendants (Gen 15:18-21; 17:1-9, 19; 22:15-18; 26:2-4, 24; 28; 35:9-13; Gal 3; Abr 2:6-11), with special 'gathering' and leadership roles assigned to the descendants of Joseph and his son Ephraim (Gen 48 and 50; Deut 33:17; 1 Chron 5:1-2; Psalm 80:2; Isaiah 11:13; Jer 31:6, 9; Ezek 37:15-19; Zech 10:6-12), and circumcision marking them as a peculiar people set apart (Gen 17:10-13).

In Genesis chapters 12–17 three covenants can be distinguished based on the differing Jahwist, Elohist and Priestly sources. In Genesis 12 and 15, God grants Abraham land and a multitude of descendants but does not place any stipulations (meaning it was unconditional) on Abraham for the covenant's fulfillment.

By contrast, Genesis 17 contains the covenant of circumcision (conditional).
 To make of Abraham a great nation and bless Abraham and make his name great so that he will be a blessing, to bless those who bless him and curse him who curses him and all peoples on earth would be blessed through Abraham.
 To give Abraham's descendants all the land from the river of Egypt to the Euphrates. Later, this land came to be referred to as the Promised Land (see map) or the Land of Israel.
 To make Abraham the father of many nations and of many descendants and give "the whole land of Canaan" to his descendants. Circumcision is to be the permanent sign of this everlasting covenant with Abraham and his male descendants and is known as the brit milah.

Covenants in biblical times were often sealed by severing an animal, with the implication that the party who breaks the covenant will suffer a similar fate. In Hebrew, the verb meaning to seal a covenant translates literally as "to cut". It is presumed by Jewish scholars that the removal of the foreskin symbolically represents such a sealing of the covenant.

According to Weinfeld, the Abrahamic covenant represents a covenant of grant, which binds the suzerain. It is the obligation of the master to his servant and involves gifts given to individuals who were loyal serving their masters. In the covenant with Abraham in Genesis 15, it is God who is the suzerain who commits himself and swears to keep the promise. In the covenant there are procedures for taking the oath, which involve a smoking oven and a blazing torch. There are many similarities between Genesis 15 and the Abba-El deed. In Genesis 15 and similarly in the Abba-El deed, it is the superior party who places himself under oath. The oaths in both, moreover, involve a situation wherein the inferior party delivers the animals while the superior party swears the oath.

The Abrahamic covenant is part of a tradition of covenantal sacrifices that dates back to the third millennium BC. The animals that are slaughtered in the covenant in Genesis 15 are considered a sacrificial offering. And it is that covenant which preserves the sacrificial element alongside the symbolic act.

Mosaic covenant

In this covenant, God promises to make the Israelites his treasured possession among all people and "a kingdom of priests and a holy nation", if they follow God's commandments. As part of the terms of this covenant, God gives Moses the Ten Commandments (Exod 24:8; these are later embellished or elaborated on in the rest of the Torah). The blood of sacrificial oxen is thereafter sprinkled on the altar and on the people to seal the covenant.

Beyond its central religious purpose, the Mosaic covenant was also political. It established Israel as a holy nation, God's special possession (Exod 19:5-6), with its chosen guardian-angel and shepherd, Yahweh/El-Elyon.

The form of the covenant resembles the suzerainty treaty in the ancient Near East. Like the treaties, the Ten Commandments begins with Yahweh's identification and what he had done for Israel ("who brought you out of the land of Egypt"; Ex 20:2) as well as the stipulations commanding absolute loyalty ("You shall not have other gods apart from me"). Unlike the suzerainty treaty, the Decalogue does not have any witness nor explicit blessings and curses. The fullest account of the Mosaic covenant is given in the book of Deuteronomy.

God gave the children of Israel the Shabbat as the permanent sign of this covenant.

Priestly covenant

The priestly covenant ( brith ha-kehuna) is the covenant that God made with Aaron and his descendants, the Aaronic priesthood, as found in the Hebrew Bible and Oral Torah. The Hebrew Bible also mentions another perpetual priestly promise with Phinehas and his descendants.

Davidic covenant

The royal covenant was made with David (2 Sam 7). It promised to establish his dynasty forever while acknowledging that its original royal-covenant promises had been given to the ancestor of the whole nation, Abraham.

The Davidic covenant  establishes David and his descendants as the kings of the united monarchy of Israel (which included Judah). The Davidic covenant is an important element in Jewish messianism and Christian theology. In Jewish eschatology, the messiah is believed to be a future Jewish king from the Davidic line, who will be anointed with holy anointing oil, gather the Jews back into the Land of Israel, usher in an era of peace, build the Third Temple, have a male heir, re-institute the Sanhedrin and rule the Jewish people during the Messianic Age.

The tablets of the Ten Commandments were kept in the Ark of the Covenant, and this became the symbol of the Israelite nation, and of God's presence with His people. Thus when King David wanted to establish Jerusalem as his own capital city he brought the Ark there (2 Sam 6).

"It is this picture of the covenant which colours most of our thinking about covenant in the Old Testament, and in the expression 'Law and Gospel' it represents the old covenant of the law [of Moses] in contrast with the new covenant of the gospel [of Jesus Christ]. But older than the Mosaic covenant was the royal covenant [of Abraham extended through David], which promised stability to the royal house."

Christianity

Christian view of Davidic covenant
Christian theologian John F. Walvoord maintains that the Davidic covenant deserves an important place in determining the purposes of God and that its exegesis confirms the doctrine of a future reign of Christ on earth. While Jewish theologians have always held that Jesus did not fulfill the expectations of a Jewish messiah, Dispensational (historically grammatically literal) biblical theologians are almost unanimous that Jesus will fully fulfill the Davidic covenant, the provisions of which Walvoord lists as:
 David is to have a child, yet to be born, who shall succeed him and establish his kingdom.
 A son (Solomon) shall build the temple instead of David.
 The throne of his kingdom shall be established forever.
 The throne will not be taken away from him (Solomon) even though his sins justify chastisement.
 David's house, throne, and kingdom shall be established forever (2 Samuel 7:16).

New covenant (Christian)
The New Covenant is a biblical interpretation originally derived from a phrase in the Book of Jeremiah, in the Hebrew Scriptures. It is often thought of as an eschatological Messianic Age or world to come and is related to the biblical concept of the Kingdom of God.

Generally, Christians believe that the New Covenant was instituted at the Last Supper as part of the Eucharist, which in the Gospel of John includes the New Commandment.
A connection between the Blood of Christ and the New Covenant is seen in most modern English translations of the New Testament with the saying: "this cup that is poured out for you is the new covenant in my blood".

Christians see Jesus as the mediator of this New Covenant, and that his blood, shed at his crucifixion is the required blood of the covenant: as with all covenants between God and man described in the Bible, the New Covenant is considered "a bond in blood sovereignly administered by God".  It has been theorized that the New Covenant is the Law of Christ as spoken during his Sermon on the Mount.

In the Christian context, this New Covenant is associated with the word 'testament' in the sense of a 'will left after the death of a person', the instructions for the inheritance of property (Latin testamentum), the original Greek word used in Scripture being diatheke (διαθήκη) which in the Greek context only meant 'will (left after death)' and virtually never 'covenant, alliance'. This fact implies a reinterpreted view of the Old Testament covenant as possessing characteristics of a 'will left after death' in Christian theology and has generated considerable attention from biblical scholars and theologians. The reason is connected with the translation of the Hebrew word for covenant, brit (בְּרִית), in the Septuagint: see 'why the word Testament' in the New Testament article.

Islam
The Mosaic covenant is referred to in a number of places in the Quran as a reminder for the Jews, of whom two tribes inhabited Medina at the time of Muhammad. The verses also mention particular commandments of the Decalogue and, in God's words, admonishes the Jews for being insolent about it and displaying violence against the prophets - a group of them they called liars, and other prophets among them they killed -  even though they agreed to keep them at the time the covenant was made.

See also
 Covenant theology
 Covenantal theology (Roman Catholic)
 Covenantal nomism
 Covenant (Latter Day Saints)
 Christian views on the Old Covenant
 New Covenant
 Oaths in Jewish tradition

References

Further reading

External links
Jewish Encyclopedia: Covenant
Nave's Topical Bible on covenants

When God Wanted to Destroy the Chosen People, G. Kugler
"What is a Covenant" from Kingdom Prologue by Meredith G. Kline (Reformed perspective)

Biblical phrases
Christian terminology
Christian theology of the Bible
Hebrew Bible topics
Jewish theology
Biblical law